Bachinsky, female form Bachinskaya, also transliterated as Bachynsky and Bachinskiy is a Slavic surname, prevalent in Ukraine, Russia, Canada and the United States.

Notable people with this surname include:

Bachinsky
 Elizabeth Bachinsky (born 1976), Canadian poet
 Gennady Bachinsky (1971-2008), Russian radio host

Bachynsky
 Nicholas Bachynsky (1887-1969), Canadian politician
 Yulian Bachynsky (1870-1940), Ukrainian diplomat

See also
 Baczynski, Polish version

Slavic-language surnames